The Miracle Mile Historic District, located on North Stone Avenue, Drachman Street, Oracle Road and Miracle Mile in Tucson, Arizona, United States, was listed as a historic district on the National Register of Historic Places in 2017.

History

Located north of downtown Tucson, the Miracle Mile Historic District is a significant commercial corridor connected to the development and alignment of Tucson's northern segment of U.S. Route 80, U.S. Route 89, and Arizona State Route 84. Throughout the mid-twentieth century, this commercial strip, known as “Miracle Mile,” functioned as the northern vehicular gateway of Tucson for travelers traversing the nation. The Miracle Mile Historic District follows the alignment of the following extant arterials: Stone Avenue, Drachman Street, Oracle Road, and Miracle Mile. Also included in the district and associated with the highway site is a two block segment of Main Avenue lined with trucking transfer warehouses and roadside commercial buildings, as well as four blocks of Flores Street containing a cluster of small motels. The bulk of the contributing resources, facing or within one block of the historic highway alignment, relate to mid‑century auto culture and were constructed in 1920 through 1963 during the district's period of significance. While the district has been rendered discontiguous by development, the identified segments have sufficient significance and integrity to meet National Register criteria. Two designated highways are routed down the Miracle Mile Historic District. The Stone Avenue, Drachman Street and Oracle Road segments of the Historic District are part of Historic U.S. Route 80, while the West Miracle Mile segment is part of Arizona State Route 77.

The Miracle Mile Historic District represents four visually and historically linked groups of buildings connected by the alignment of historical U.S. Route 80/89, which is also a contributor to the district. In total, the Miracle Mile Historic District includes 102 individual properties, many with multiple buildings, structures, and objects. Within the Miracle Mile Historic District are 279 individual resources, including 215 buildings, 1 site, 34 structures, and 29 objects. Of these resources, 258 are contributors to the district, including 198 buildings, 31 structures, 28 objects, and 1 site, while 21 are non-contributors, including 17 buildings, 3 structures, and 1 object. The district includes important buildings including the 1953 Tucson Inn, and African American Beau Brummel Club.

Important buildings
 AAA Branch Office, 234 West Drachman Street, 1960
 De Luxe Motel, 1650 North Oracle Road, 1948 
 Duke's Drive Inn & Beau Brummel Club, 1148 North Main Avenue, 1947
 El Rancho Motor Hotel, 225 West Drachman Street, 1948
 Frontier Motel, 227 West Drachman Street, 1941/48 architect: George J. Wolf
 Flamingo Hotel, 1300 North Stone Avenue, 1954 
 G. D. F. Frazier Service Station, 648 North Stone Avenue, 1937
 Ghost Ranch Lodge, 801 West Miracle Mile, 1941
 Golden Pin Lanes, 922 West Miracle Mile, 1950
 Hacienda Motel, 1704 North Oracle Road, c.1940
 Highland Tower Motel, 1919 North Oracle Road, 1941
 Oracle Court, 2649 North Oracle Road, 1940
 Pago Pago Restaurant & Lounge, 2201 North Oracle Road, c, 1945    
 Riviera Motor Lodge, 515 West Miracle Mile, 1953 
 Monterey Court, 505 West Miracle Mile, 1952
 Motel El Corral, 2725 North Oracle Road, 1949 
 La Siesta Motel, 1602 North Oracle Road, 1941 
 Sun Land Motel, 465 West Miracle Mile, 1952
 Thunderbird Lodge, 1941, architect: George J. Wolf 
 Terrace Mote, 631 West Miracle Mile, 1949 
 Tidelands Motor Inn (Sahara Motel), 919 North Stone Avenue, 1960 
 Tucson House, 1501 North Oracle Road, 1963
 Tucson Inn, 143 West Drachman Street, 1953
 Wash Well, 2 West Drachman Street, 1955 
 Wayward Winds Motel, 707 West Miracle Mile, 1958

See also
National Register of Historic Places listings in Pima County, Arizona

References

Historic districts on the National Register of Historic Places in Arizona
Geography of Tucson, Arizona
National Register of Historic Places in Tucson, Arizona
Buildings and structures in Pima County, Arizona
Historic district contributing properties in Arizona
National Register of Historic Places in Pima County, Arizona
U.S. Route 80
U.S. Route 89